Ivy Yin (born July 14, 1978) is a Taiwanese actress whose career includes roles in television films and series.

Filmography

Film

Television series

Variety show

Theater

Published works

Awards and nominations

References

External links

 

1978 births
Living people
21st-century Taiwanese actresses
Taiwanese film actresses
Taiwanese television actresses
Taiwanese stage actresses
Taiwanese people of Hakka descent
Actresses from Taoyuan City